Izz-un-Nissa Begum was the third wife of the Mughal emperor Shah Jahan. She is popularly known by the title, Akbarabadi Mahal (which probably indicates that she hailed from the city of Akbarabad), and commissioned the Akbarabadi Mosque in Shahjahanabad (present-day Old Delhi). Less commonly, she is also referred to as Sirhindi Begum.

Family
Izz-un-Nissa Begum was the daughter of Mirza Iraj who held the title, Shahnawaz Khan. He was the son of Abdul Rahim Khan-I-Khana, and the grandson of Bairam Khan. Bairam Khan was a descendant of Pir-ali Baharlu, a Black Sheep Turkoman. She had a brother Mirza Khan Manuchir.

Marriage
In 1617, after the Deccan victory, Prince Khurram (future Shah Jahan) proposed to his father, Emperor Jahangir that Abdul Rahim Khan, Izz-un-Nissa's grandfather, should be given the governorship of all newly secured southern islands. He also made Izz-un-Nissa's father, Shahnawaz Khan de facto commander-in-chief of the southern islands. Both the appointments served to guarantee their future loyalty to Shah Jahan. He tied the knot more firmly in a traditional way, by taking Shahnawaz's young daughter Izz-un-Nissa Begum, as his third wife. He did not even bother to consult his father, Jahangir. However, according to Muhammad Amin Qazvini, a contemporary court biographer from the reign of Shah Jahan, the marriage was forced upon the prince. The wedding took place at Burhanpur on 2 September 1617, and was a full 'bond of matrimony through a religious sanctioned marriage ceremony.'

On 25 June 1619, at Agra, she gave birth to her only child, a son. Jahangir named him Sultan Jahan Afroz Mirza. But as the child was not born in an auspicious hour, he did not kept him with himself, and instead sent him to his great grandfather, Abdul Rahim Khan in Deccan, in the company of Abdul Rahim's daughter Janan Begum, the widow of the late Prince Daniyal Mirza, to be brought under his care. Jahangir stated in his memoirs Tuzk-e-Jahangiri that in 1621 all the astrologers thought that Prince Shah Shuja, son of Shah Jahan, who had contracted smallpox, would die. However, according to the astrologer Jotik Rai, another of his sons whom Jahangir did not like would die. And so Izz-un-Niss's son died prematurely at Burhanpur in March 1621.

According to a saying of the contemporary chronicler Inayat Khan, although Shah Jahan had married her and Kandahari Begum, 'Yet his whole delight was centered in this illustrious lady (Mumtaz Mahal), to such an extent that he did not feel towards the others one thousandth part of the affection that he did for Her late Majesty.' According to Qazvini, 'these two wives enjoyed nothing more than the title of wifeship.' However, after the death of Mumtaz Mahal, Inayat Khan noted that Izz-un-nissa Begum and Fatehpuri Mahal (another one of his wives) were especially favoured by the emperor.

Death
Izz-un-Nissa survived her husband, who was deeply concerned about her welfare at the time of his death in 1666. She died 12 years later on 28 January 1678 in Agra. Izz-un-Nissa Begum was buried in the Sirhindi Garden laid out by her in the Sabji Mandi area in the outskirts of Shahjahanabad (present-day Old Delhi). Her tomb is referred to as the tomb of Sirhindi Begum. This must be another title of Izz-un-Nissa Begum.

Contributions to architecture
Izz-un-Nissa Begum provided a serai and an impressive mosque in a major market in the south part of Delhi. Shah Jahan used this mosque for prayer until his own was completed in 1656. It no longer exists, but 19th century illustrations indicate that the mosque was similar to contemporary ones built by Fatehpuri Mahal (another one of Shah Jahan's wives) and Jahanara Begum.

References

Bibliography
 
 

Year of birth missing
1678 deaths
17th-century Indian women
Indian female royalty
Mughal nobility
17th-century Indian Muslims
Indian queen consorts
People from Kandahar
Indian people of Turkic descent
Royal consorts
Women of the Mughal Empire
Wives of Shah Jahan
People from Agra